James Andrew Meeks (March 7, 1864 – November 10, 1946) was a U.S. Representative from Illinois.

Born in New Matamoras, Washington County, Ohio, Meeks moved to Illinois with his parents, who settled on a farm near Danville, Vermilion County, in 1865.
He attended the public schools, Westfield College, and Illinois College at Jacksonville.
He studied law.
He was admitted to the bar in 1890 and commenced practice in Danville, Illinois.
He served as master in chancery of the circuit court 1903-1915.
Corporation counsel of Danville 1925-1931.
He served as delegate to the Democratic National Conventions in 1920, 1924, 1928, and 1932.

Meeks was elected as a Democrat to the Seventy-third, Seventy-fourth, and Seventy-fifth Congresses (March 4, 1933 – January 3, 1939).
He was an unsuccessful candidate for reelection in 1938 to the Seventy-sixth Congress and for election in 1940 to the Seventy-seventh Congress.
He resumed the practice of law and also engaged in banking until his death in Danville, Illinois, November 10, 1946.
He was interred in Spring Hill Cemetery in Danville, Illinois.

References

1864 births
1946 deaths
Democratic Party members of the United States House of Representatives from Illinois
People from Washington County, Ohio